Abdarhmane Coulibaly (born 29 September 1985 in Mézières-sur-Seine) is a French Muay Thai kickboxer. His brother is the footballer Ousmane Coulibaly.

Kickboxing

Coulibaly is set to fight Turpal Tokaev at W5 Grand Prix Kitek in Moscow, Russia on 18 February 2017.

Titles

Professional 
2016 K-1 Event Grand Prix 2016 Tournament Runner Up
2015 VVWS Heavyweight World Champion
2013 WAKO PRO Low Kick Heavyweight World Champion +94,200 kg
2010 Fight For Peace Heavyweight Tournament Champion
2010 W.P.M.F. Muaythai European Champion -91 kg

Amateur 
2013 WAKO world championship  +91 kg (K-1 rules)
2008 I.F.M.A. World Muaythai Championships in Busan, South Korea

Professional kickboxing record 

|-
|-  bgcolor="#CCFFCC"
| 2017-12-02 || Win || align="left" | Vladimir Toktasynov || Mix Fight Gala 23  || Frankfurt, Germany || Decision (Unanimous) || 3 || 3:00
|-
|-  bgcolor="#CCFFCC"
| 2017-10-28 || Win ||align=left| Florent Kaouachi || Glory 47: Lyon || Lyon, France || Decision (split) || 3 || 3:00
|-
|-  bgcolor="FFBBBB"
| 2017-03-25 || Loss ||align=left| Dexter Suisse || Victory 2017 || Levallois, France || Decision || 3 ||3:00 
|-
|-  bgcolor="FFBBBB"
| 2017-02-18 || Loss ||align=left| Turpal Tokaev  || W5 Grand Prix Kitek XXXIX || Moscow, Russia || TKO (referee stoppage) || 3 || 
|-
|-  bgcolor="FFBBBB"
| 2016-05-09 || Loss ||align=left| Kevin Kieu || Partouche Kickboxing Tour, Semi-finals || Le Havre, France || KO (Injury)  || 2 || 
|-
|-  bgcolor="FFBBBB"
| 2016-02-20 || Loss ||align=left| Nordine Mahieddine || K-1 Events 8, Final || Troyes, France || Decision || 3 ||3:00
|-
! style="background:white" colspan=9 | 
|-  bgcolor="#CCFFCC"
| 2016-02-20 || Win ||align=left| Hacen Otman || K-1 Events 8, Semi-finals || Troyes, France || TKO (RTD) || 2 ||
|-
|-  bgcolor="#CCFFCC"
| 2015-11-28 || Win ||align=left| Freddy Kemayo  || Venum Victory World Series 2015 || Paris, France || TKO (Leg Injury) || 1 || 
|-
! style=background:white colspan=9 |
|- 
|-  bgcolor="FFBBBB" 
| 2015-06-19 || Loss ||align=left| Andrei Stoica || SUPERKOMBAT World Grand Prix III 2015 || Constanța, Romania || Decision (Unanimous) || 3 || 3:00 
|-
|-  bgcolor="FFBBBB"
| 2014-09-13 || Loss ||align=left| Andrey Gerasimchuk || Kunlun Fight 10, Semi-finals ||  Minsk, Belarus || Decision (Unanimous) || 3 || 3:00
|-
|-  bgcolor="FFBBBB"
| 2014-08-15 || Loss ||align=left| Dževad Poturak || No Limit 7 || Zenica, Bosnia and Herzegovina || KO (Right Overhand) || 2 || 
|-
! style=background:white colspan=9 |
|- 
|-  bgcolor="FFBBBB"
| 2013-12-14 || Loss ||align=left| Freddy Kemayo || Victory || Paris, France ||Decision || 3|| 3:00
|-
|-  bgcolor="FFBBBB"
| 2013-11-23 || Loss ||align=left| Stéphane Susperregui || La 20ème Nuit des Champions || Marseilles, France || Decision || 3 || 3:00
|-
! style=background:white colspan=9 |
|-
|-  bgcolor="#c5d2ea"
| 2013-05-11 || Draw ||align=left| Redouan Cairo || THE GAME || Saint-Denis, La Réunion || Decision  || 3 || 3:00
|-
|-  bgcolor="#CCFFCC"
| 2013-03-09 || Win ||align=left| Ragim Aliev || Monte-Carlo Fighting Masters || Monte Carlo, Monaco || KO || 2 || 
|-
! style=background:white colspan=9 |
|- 
|-  bgcolor="#CCFFCC"
| 2012-11-09 || Win ||align=left| Fabrice Aurieng || Maxi Fight 4 || Saint-Denis, Réunion || Decision || 3 || 3:00
|-
|-  bgcolor="#CCFFCC"
| 2012-05-12 || Win ||align=left| Zinedine Hameur-Lain || Wicked One Tournament  || Paris, France || TKO || 2 ||
|- 
|-  bgcolor="#CCFFCC"
| 2012-02-18 || Win ||align=left| Tomboron Samake || HMT : le choc des villes || France || KO || 2 || 
|- 
|-  bgcolor="#FFBBBB"
| 2011-11-06 || Loss ||align=left| Nathan Corbett || Muaythai Premier League: Round 3 || The Hague, Netherlands || Decision (Unanimous) || 3 || 3:00
|-
|-  bgcolor="#CCFFCC"
| 2011-04-23 || Win ||align=left| Massinissa Hamaili || Le choc des ceintures || France || KO ||  || 
|- 
|-  bgcolor="#CCFFCC"
| 2011-04-02 || Win ||align=left| David Radeff || Explosion Fight Night Volume 3 || Brest, France || Decision (Majority) || 5 || 3:00
|- 
|-  bgcolor="#CCFFCC"
| 2010-11-19 || Win ||align=left| Zinedine Hameur-Lain || Fight For Peace, Final || France || TKO || 2 || 
|-
! style=background:white colspan=9 |
|-
|-  bgcolor="#CCFFCC"
| 2010-11-19 || Win ||align=left| Hichem Abdellal || Fight For Peace, Semi-finals || France || Decision || 3 || 3:00 
|-
|-  bgcolor="#CCFFCC"
| 2010-10-29 || Win ||align=left| Sahak Parparyan || France vs. Lumpinee || Paris, France || Decision || 5 || 3:00 
|-
! style=background:white colspan=9 |
|-
|-  bgcolor="#FFBBBB"
| 2010-10-15 || Loss ||align=left| Yuksel Ayaydin || Maxi Fight 2 || Saint-Denis, Réunion || Decision (Unanimous) || 3 || 3:00
|-
|-  bgcolor="#CCFFCC"
| 2010-05-08 || Win ||align=left| Ricardo Cabral || La nuit des défis || France || Decision  || 3 || 3:00
|-
|-  bgcolor="#CCFFCC"
| 2010-02-26 || Win ||align=left| Wehaj Kingboxing || Lumpini Kerkkrai: VILLAUME vs SAIYOKE || Bangkok, Thailand || Decision (Unanimous) || 3 || 3:00
|-
|-  bgcolor="#CCFFCC"
| 2009-12-04 || Win ||align=left|  || King's Birthday || Bangkok, Thailand || KO || 2 || 
|-
|-  bgcolor="#CCFFCC"
| 2008-12-06 || Win ||align=left| Steve Zaidi || Les chocs de Légendes II || France || Decision (Unanimous) || 3 || 3:00
|-
|-  bgcolor="#CCFFCC"
| 2008-04-19 || Win ||align=left| Hichem Medoukali || Finales championnat National France 2008 || France || KO || 1 || 
|-
! style=background:white colspan=9 |
|-
|-  bgcolor="#CCFFCC"
| 2007-11-09 || Win ||align=left| Emmanuel Payet || Nuit des défis || France || KO || 2 || 
|-
|-  bgcolor="#FFBBBB"
| 2007-07-14 || Loss ||align=left| Serdar Karaca || Franthaifull France VS Rayong Sports Germany || Heidenheim, Germany || Decision || 3 || 3:00
|-

|-
|-  bgcolor="#CCFFCC"
| 2013-10 || Win ||align=left| Alexei Kudin || W.A.K.O World Championships 2013, K-1 Final +91 kg  || Guaruja, Brasil ||  ||  || 
|-
! style=background:white colspan=9 |
|-
|-  bgcolor="#CCFFCC"
| 2013-10 || Win ||align=left| Kostadin Kostov || W.A.K.O World Championships 2013, K-1 Semi-finals +91 kg  || Guaruja, Brasil ||  ||  || 
|-
|-  bgcolor="#CCFFCC"
| 2013-10 || Win ||align=left| Alex Rossi || W.A.K.O World Championships 2013, K-1 Quarter-finals +91 kg  || Guaruja, Brasil ||  ||  || 
|-
|-  bgcolor="#CCFFCC"
| 2013-10 || Win ||align=left| Sors Grobbelaar || W.A.K.O World Championships 2013, K-1 1st Round +91 kg  || Guaruja, Brasil ||  ||  || 
|-
|-
| colspan=9 | Legend:

See also 
List of male kickboxers

References

External links
 Profile at muaythaitv.com
 MuayThai Premier League profile

1985 births
Living people
Sportspeople from Yvelines
French male kickboxers
French Muay Thai practitioners
Heavyweight kickboxers
French sportspeople of Malian descent
Kunlun Fight kickboxers
Glory kickboxers
SUPERKOMBAT kickboxers